Fraserwood/Tribble Ranch Field Aerodrome  is located  southwest of Fraserwood, Manitoba, Canada.

References

Registered aerodromes in Manitoba